Prisomera is a genus of phasmids belonging to the family Lonchodidae.

Species:

Prisomera asperum 
Prisomera auscultator 
Prisomera canna 
Prisomera cyllabacum 
Prisomera ignava 
Prisomera mimas 
Prisomera nodosum 
Prisomera obsolefactum 
Prisomera spinicollis 
Prisomera spinosissimum

References

Lonchodidae
Phasmatodea genera